Out of This World is an album by saxophonist Teddy Edwards recorded in Denmark in 1980 for the SteepleChase label. The 1995 CD reissue added an additional track.

Reception

In his review for AllMusic, Scott Yanow stated "Teddy Edwards has yet to record an unworthy set and his swinging session (one of only two that he made as a leader during 1977–90) will be enjoyed by bop collectors".

Track listing
All compositions by Teddy Edwards except where noted.
 "No Name No. 1" – 6:00
 "April Love" – 6:47
 "Out of This World" (Harold Arlen, Johnny Mercer) – 11:07
 "Summertime" (George Gershwin, DuBose Heyward) – 8:29
 "That's All" (Bob Haymes, Alam Brandt) – 8:00
 "Cheek to Cheek" (Irving Berlin) – 6:05
 "Summertime" [alternate take] (Gershwin, Heyward) – 10:48  Bonus track on CD reissue

Personnel 
Teddy Edwards – tenor saxophone
Kenny Drew – piano
Jesper Lundgaard – bass  
Billy Hart – drums

References 

1981 albums
Teddy Edwards albums
SteepleChase Records albums